Matthew Garrett "Matt" Stinson (born September 9, 1992) is a former Canadian soccer player who last played for amateur club Vaughan Azzurri SC in League1 Ontario. Stinson is currently an assistant coach for his alma mater, the York Lions.

Career

Youth
Born in Toronto, Ontario, Stinson began his youth career in the age of five with the Armour Heights Soccer AssociationClub, before joined two years in the age of nine to North York Hearts SC. He played until December 2006 with the Hearts Soccer Club, before played for Clarkson Comets SC in Mississauga, Ontario. In 2008, aged 16, he joined TFC Academy for the youth sides inaugural season in the Canadian Soccer League. Stinson quickly progressed in the academy and eventually was named captain of the academy team. In 2010, he left the academy to attend Winthrop University in South Carolina. While at Winthrop, Stinson was named the Team MVP and earned All-Big South Conference Second Team honours.

Professional
In late January 2011 it was announced that Stinson would travel with Toronto's Senior team to Turkey for preseason training camp, Stinson was one of four academy players invited to travel. On February 16, 2011, Stinson scored the game's only goal to lift Toronto FC to a 1–0 victory over Red Star Belgrade during the club's preseason. After impressing during the preseason training camp he signed with Toronto FC on March 17, 2011. Stinson made his professional debut on June 25, 2011, as a second half sub for Javier Martina in a 3–1 away loss to Real Salt Lake.

Stinson was released by Toronto FC on March 19, 2013 and trained with Armour Heights S.C., before returned for his studies to the York University. He played his first match in his comeback for the York Lions on September 30, 2013, against the Brock University men soccer Team Badgers. Stinson has been a student of York University since September 2011.

International
Stinson has represented Canada at various youth levels. In 2010, he represented Canada at the Under-20 level.

On November 3, 2011, Stinson was called up to the Canadian senior team for Canada's final two matches of 2014 CONCACAF second round world cup qualification vs. Saint Kitts and Nevis Three days latter Stinson was removed from the line-up due to injury, Nana Attakora was brought in to replace him in the 18 man squad. Stinson made his senior team debut January 29, 2013 in an international friendly against United States. He came on as a second half sub for Terry Dunfield, as the game ended in a 0–0 draw.

Honours

Toronto FC
Canadian Championship (2): 2011, 2012

Club Statistics

Last updated on September 13, 2012

References

External links

 York profile

1992 births
Association football midfielders
Canada men's international soccer players
Canada men's under-23 international soccer players
Canada men's youth international soccer players
Canadian Soccer League (1998–present) players
Canadian soccer players
Homegrown Players (MLS)
Living people
Major League Soccer players
League1 Ontario players
Soccer players from Toronto
Toronto FC players
Winthrop Eagles men's soccer players
York Lions soccer players
York Lions men's soccer coaches
Vaughan Azzurri players